Pabstiella calcarata is a species of orchid native to Central and South America.

References

calcarata
Taxa named by Alfred Cogniaux